Jack Mulhern is an American actor. He is best known for his roles in The Society, Mare of Easttown, and Locke & Key.

Mulhern graduated from Skidmore College in 2017.

Filmography

Film

Television

References

External links 

Living people
21st-century American male actors
American male film actors
Skidmore College alumni
Year of birth missing (living people)